Onychodictyon is a genus of extinct lobopodian known from the Lower Cambrian Chengjiang Maotianshan Shales in the Yunnan Province in China. It was characterized by a stout body covered by fleshy papillae and pairs of sclerotized plates with spines, representing part of the diverse "armoured lobopodians" alongside similar forms such as Microdictyon and Hallucigenia.

It has a resemblance to Microdictyon (net-like sclerite ornament) but also Aysheaia and tardigrade (basally-fused terminal leg pair). Each leg have a pair of curved claws that are thought to have aided Onychodictyon climb onto other organisms. Onychodictyon sclerites appear to have molted with some specimens exhibiting perfectly conjoined plates from successive molts.

Onychodictyon is represented by two species: O. ferox which has a pair of simple eyes and feathery antenniform appendages on its head; and O. gracilis which has a blunt front end without evidence of any appendages.

References 

 
Prehistoric marine animals